Ust-Pyora is a rural locality (a selo) in Dmitriyevsky Selsoviet of Svobodnensky District, Amur Oblast, Russia. The population was 356 as of 2018. There are 10 streets.

Geography 
Ust-Pyora is located on the right bank of the Bolshaya Pyora River, 16 km north of Svobodny (the district's administrative centre) by road. Yukhta-3 is the nearest rural locality.

References 

Rural localities in Svobodnensky District